Jean Delvaux (died 2 April 1595) was a Belgian Roman Catholic monk and an alleged practitioner of witchcraft.

In 1595, a scandal occurred among the monks at an Abbey at Stavelot in the Ardennes. The monk Jean Delvaux claimed that, at the age of fifteen, he met a man in the woods who promised him riches if he would follow him. Delvaux abided and he received two marks on his shoulders. He told Delvaux to become a monk at Stavelot, and promised that he would become an abbot. Delvaux did indeed become a monk, and discovered many warlocks among the priests and monks. He said, that there were nine convents of warlocks in the Ardennes, who met during the night with demons to eat, dance and engage in sex. 

Delvaux was arrested on the order of the Prince-bishop of Liége, and an investigation was begun. On the way to Stavelot, the carriage of the commission broke down, and Delvaux claimed that a demon had destroyed it; Delvaux was accused of being insane. Until 10 January 1597, lay and clerical people were questioned in connection with these accusations. Delvaux was tortured and handed over to the secular authorities. He was found guilty, under Exodus 22:18, and sentenced to death. The remorseful Delvaux begged for mercy, but he was executed by decapitation, and not by burning.

References

Literature 
 Procès pour sorcellerie en Ardenne, Walthère Jamar, Chevron dans le passé

1595 deaths
Belgian Christian monks
People executed for witchcraft
Year of birth unknown
Place of birth missing